Take Me for What I'm Worth is the fifth studio album by the English rock band The Searchers and the group's first LP which missed the official Record Retailer Top 20 album chart in the United Kingdom. Released in the end of 1965 it was the last album by the Searchers before the leader of the band Chris Curtis left. Album included some songs written by members of the band as well as cover versions of some well known tracks originally recorded by The Ronettes ("Be My Baby"), Fats Domino ("I’m Ready"), Marvin Gaye ("I'll Be Doggone") or Ian and Sylvia ("Four Strong Winds"). The title track, written by P. F. Sloan, was the last Top 20 hit for the band in the UK.

Overview and recording
Sessions for Take Me for What I'm Worth LP began in May 1965 at Pye Studios. There were reports in the press at the same time, that The Beatles manager Brian Epstein would take over the group, but this did not happen. In fact, Epstein probably wouldn't be able to help the band with commercial success because nearly all of his merseybeat bands (included Gerry and the Pacemakers, Billy J. Kramer and the Dakotas, The Fourmost etc.) had the same problems with waning popularity in 1965. Still, Frank Allen said: "Eppy would  have had the clout to do more for us, but what we really needed was control in the studio. We made nice records, but we were losing our way," and he added: "We didn't take enough care  finishing the records off."

Chris Curtis take over direction of the band previous year. He picked up (or wrote) and arranged the most songs and he also found P. J. Proby's "Take Me for What I'm Worth" which became their Top 20 hit and the title track of this album. He loved both the melody and the lyrics of the song: "It’s a very profound statement and it could have become a gay anthem," said in interview with Spencer Leigh. 
John McNally's songwriting would evolve over the years and flourish with interesting compositions. As a songwriter, he has contributed with two songs to the record "It's Time' and "Don't You Know Why". One more self-penned number featured on the album, band's lyrical composition with the beautiful flute solo "Too Many Miles" (the song was primarily written by  Chris Curtis). During these sessions, out-take version of the Marvin Gaye hit was made: an alternate "I'll Be Doggone" with Chris Curtis on lead vocals (released only on US LP The Searchers No. 4).

Although the album was completed very soon, it stayed in the vaults for another five months and it was not released until the end of the year. This could have had a major impact on the album's failure, because the British music scene was evolving very fast at that time.

Release
Take Me for What I'm Worth was released as a mono LP album on the Pye label with the catalogue number NPL 18120 and as a stereo album NSPL 18120 but failed to chart (Record Retailer printed only the Top 20 album chart in 1965).

Track listing

The First US version (The Searchers No. 4)

In September 1965 (prior to UK release), Kapp Records released the first US version of the LP, as The Searchers No. 4, with a different cover art and with a slightly different track listing. Kapp removed "I'm Ready", "It's Time", "Too Many Miles" and "Take Me For What I'm Worth" and added the hit singles Goodbye My Love and He's Got No Love (as well as the group's self-penned B-sides "Till I Met You" and "So Far Away"). Early front covers incorrectly show a song titled "Can't You Just See Me", later correct this to "I'm Your Lovin' Man". Album entered the Billboard Top 200 LP charts on October 23, 1965, went to No. 149 and stayed for 2 weeks. The opening track "You Can't Lie To a Liar" was released as a single  b/w "Don't You Know Why", but missed the charts.

Track listing

The Second US version (Take Me for What I'm Worth)

In February 1966 Kapp Records released LP again. This time under the UK title Take Me for What I'm Worth and with a similar cover art (with B/W photo of the band). Once again it was released with a different track listing included previous UK hit singles "He's Got No Love" and When I Get Home (written by Bobby Darin) and their B-sides. For some reasons, both US editions omitted the UK opening rock and roll stomper „I’m Ready“ (originally by Fats Domino), which was released as a single in some European countries as Germany or Sweden.

Track listing

Personnel
The Searchers
 Mike Pender – lead guitar, lead vocals, backing vocals
 John McNally – rhythm guitar, lead and backing vocals
 Frank Allen – bass, lead and backing vocals
 Chris Curtis – drums, lead and backing vocals
Additional musicians and production
 Tony Hatch – producer, piano
 Ray Prickett – Recording engineer

References

Pye Records albums
The Searchers (band) albums
Albums produced by Tony Hatch
1965 albums